David Peters is an American musician. He was the original guitarist for the band Eighteen Visions, guitarist for the band Throwdown, and, as of 2002, the vocalist for Throwdown. He did guest vocals for the song "Unleash" by groove metal band Soulfly, for the song "Feel as Though You Could" by Demon Hunter, and the song "Despair" for Living Sacrifice. He follows a straight edge lifestyle.

Discography 
Eighteen Visions
 Lifeless (1997)

Throwdown

As guitarist
 Drive Me Dead (EP, 2000)
 You Don't Have to Be Blood to Be Family (2001)
 Throwdown / Good Clean Fun (EP, 2001)
 Face the Mirror (EP, 2002)

As vocalist
 Haymaker (2003)
 Vendetta (2005)
 Americana / Planets Collide (EP, 2007)
 Venom & Tears (2007)
 Covered with Venom (EP, 2007)
 Deathless (2009)
 Intolerance (2014)
 Take Cover (EP, 2020)

Guest vocals
 "Unleash" by Soulfly
 "Feel As Though You Could" by Demon Hunter
 "Despair" by Living Sacrifice

References

External links 

Dave Peters on Discogs

American heavy metal guitarists
American heavy metal singers
American male guitarists
American male singers
Bleeding Through members
Living people
Year of birth missing (living people)
Throwdown (band) members